This page is about the ancestor of the Valerii.  For the Latin personal name, see Volesus (praenomen).
Volesus or Volusus, sometimes called Volesus Valerius, was the eponymous ancestor of gens Valeria, one of the greatest patrician houses at Rome.  He is said to have come to Rome with Titus Tatius, king of the Sabine town of Cures, during the reign of Romulus, the founder and first king of Rome.

Biographical details
Little is known of Volesus, but it is generally assumed that he was himself a Sabine, and that he came from the town of Cures.  The few historical mentions of him imply that he was a powerful warrior, which would explain his presence in the retinue of Titus Tatius, although his character may also have been suggested by his name, which was believed to derive from the Latin verb, valere, to be strong, or its Oscan cognate.  He would probably have been born early in the 8th century BC.

Legacy
As related by the historian Titus Livius and others, much of the early Roman populace was of Sabine origin, and Volesus was claimed as ancestor by one of the oldest, largest, and noblest houses at Rome.  His descendants held every magistracy of the Roman Republic, included scholars, statesmen, and generals, and were in the forefront of public affairs throughout the whole of Roman history.

The praenomen Volesus was also used occasionally by the Valerii, who also used it as a cognomen, usually with the spelling Volusus.  The family also revived the praenomen from time to time, after it had fallen out of general use, as late as the 1st century AD.  The name was used by a few other gentes, including the gens Publilia, who used the form Volero, but the memory of Volesus, first of the Valerii, was the most enduring.

See also
Valerius
Praenomen

Notes

8th-century BC births
Italic people
Valerii
Sabine people
8th-century BC Romans

ca:Volús